Mark Cooke (born January 11) is an American country music singer from East Texas. His debut single, "Can't Cheat In A Small Town," was released in early 2011. It was followed by the release of his debut EP, Living For The Weekend, on September 28, 2011.

Early life and career
Cooke always dreamed of becoming a country musician. But when he graduated high school, he chose to join the United States Navy. While at sea and around the world, Cooke worked on his vocal and writing skills. After he had fulfilled his duty with the Navy, he began his musical career.

Cooke later started the Cooke County Line band with future brother in law Joe Rodriquez. The seven-piece band played across Central Texas and neighboring states. During this period, Cooke opened for or played with many veteran acts including John Rich, George Jones, Miranda Lambert, Tracy Lawrence, Chris Cagle, Little Jimmy Dickens, Whispering Bill Anderson, David Lee Murphy, David Allan Coe, Robert Earl Keen, Ray Wiley Hubbard, Charlie Robison, Ty Herndon, Linda Davis and more. Eventually, he moved to Nashville to launch his solo career.

Musical career
Mark Cooke was recently signed by Nashville record label CVR run by veteran producers J Gary Smith and John Smith. ingle "Can't Cheat In A Small Town" was on  the Billboard Indicator chart in early 2011 and the music video was featured on CMT Pure.

Cooke's second single "I Love It" was released and hit the radio March 14, 2011 and is from his debut EP "Living For The Weekend." His current single "Any Way The Wind Blows" is now on the radio.

Discography

Extended plays

Singles

Music videos

References 

American country singer-songwriters
People from Longview, Texas
American male singer-songwriters
Living people
Year of birth missing (living people)
Singer-songwriters from Texas
Country musicians from Texas